Latvia competed at the 2022 World Games held in Birmingham, United States from 7 to 17 July 2022.

Competitors
The following is the list of number of competitors in the Games.

Air sports

Three competitors represented Latvia in drone racing.

Floorball

Latvia finished in 4th place in the floorball tournament.

Inline hockey

Latvia finished in 7th place in the inline hockey tournament.

Karate

One competitor represented Latvia in karate.

Orienteering

Latvia competed in orienteering.

Water skiing

Roberts Linavskis competed in the men's wakeboard event.

References

Nations at the 2022 World Games
World Games
World Games